The Meissner Lop is a breed of domestic rabbit recognised by the British Rabbit Council (BRC). It is similar to, but more slender than, the French Lop. The BRC currently designates the Meissner Lop as a member of its "Rare Varieties Club".

See also

List of rabbit breeds
Lop rabbit

References

Rabbit breeds
Lop rabbits